Kenichi Obinata (born 17 January 1968) is a Japanese rower. He competed in the men's lightweight double sculls event at the 1996 Summer Olympics.

References

1968 births
Living people
Japanese male rowers
Olympic rowers of Japan
Rowers at the 1996 Summer Olympics
Sportspeople from Niigata Prefecture
Asian Games medalists in rowing
Rowers at the 1994 Asian Games
Asian Games gold medalists for Japan
Medalists at the 1994 Asian Games